Rajani Ashokrao Patil  (born 5 December 1958)  is an Indian politician from the Indian National Congress Party, she is the All India Congress Committee In-charge for Jammu & Kashmir. She is a Member of Parliament, representing Maharashtra in the Rajya Sabha the upper house of Indian Parliament . She was awarded the Best debut Parliamentarian award for her performance in the Rajya Sabha. She was earlier elected to the Lok Sabha from Beed in the 11th Lok Sabha. In 2005, she was elected as the Chairperson of the Central Social Welfare Board. She represented India at the 49th session of the UN Commission on the status of women at the UN headquarters in New York. She was a student political leader in college in the National Students Union of India(NSUI). She started her career in electoral politics by getting elected to the Zilla Parishad unopposed in 1992.

References

External links
Rajani Patil Rajya Sabha Profile
Official biographical sketch in Parliament of India website

1958 births
Living people
Patil Rajni
Lok Sabha members from Maharashtra
India MPs 1996–1997
Women in Maharashtra politics
Marathi politicians
Bharatiya Janata Party politicians from Maharashtra
20th-century Indian women politicians
20th-century Indian politicians
Women members of the Rajya Sabha